Yun Yat (1934 – 15 June 1997), also known by her alias Comrade At, was the wife of Son Sen, Defense Minister of Democratic Kampuchea. On 9 October 1975, the Standing Committee of Communist Party of Kampuchea placed her in charge of information and education inside and outside of the country. In 1977, she was appointed as Information Minister after Hu Nim's arrest and execution.

On 10 June 1997 Khieu Samphan (former Chair of the State Presidium) declared that Yun Yat and Son Sen had been arrested as spies of Hun Sen and Vietnam, and declared as traitors. Yun Yat, Son Sen and eight of their relatives were executed on 15 June 1997 by the Khmer Rouge rump state.

References

1934 births
1997 deaths
Communist Party of Kampuchea politicians
Cambodian communists
Khmer Rouge party members
Government ministers of Cambodia
Vietnamese spies
Executed Cambodian women
People executed for treason against Cambodia
20th-century executions for treason
Cambodian politicians convicted of crimes
20th-century Cambodian women politicians
Women government ministers of Cambodia
20th-century Cambodian politicians
Executed communists